A high bailiff in the United States state of Vermont is an elected public official whose office is unique to local government in Vermont. High bailiffs are elected in each of Vermont's fourteen counties.

The duties of high bailiff are to serve writs which the sheriff is incapable of serving, such as the writ of arrest of the sheriff, and to temporarily succeed to the office of the sheriff in the event of the sheriff's incarceration or incapacity.  In practice, an officeholder "rarely, if ever, does anything". In 2016, the high bailiff of Addison County noted that it was not unusual for a person to hold the office for more than two decades without having to perform any official function. 

While historically the office has largely been held by members of the law enforcement community, in 2020 several candidates ran for High Bailiff on a platform calling for civilian oversight of law enforcement. Three of those candidates won: former State's Attorney Bobby Sand in Windsor County, college student Asa Kinder in Washington County, and attorney and drug policy reform advocate Dave Silberman in Addison County.

References

Politics of Vermont